Mendirman Jaloliddin (Uzbek Cyrillic: Мендирман Жалолиддин,  Mendirman Zhaloliddin; ,) is an Uzbek-Turkish television series produced by Mehmet Bozdağ with the Uzbek Ministry of Culture and Sports. It is based on the life of Jalal ad-Din Mingburnu, the last ruler of the Khwarazmian Empire. He is portrayed by Turkish actor Emre Kıvılcım. Mendirman Jaloliddin has also been well-received in Pakistan with only its first episode being a success in the country. The first season of the series ended its run in Uzbekistan on 9 May 2021.

Plot 
The television series focuses on the life of Jalal ad-Din Mingburnu, son of Ala ad-Din Muhammad of the Khwarazmian Empire, and how he faced Genghis Khan of the Mongol Empire along with the troubles in his own state including the fight for the throne between his father and grandmother Terken Khatun. Meanwhile, he also struggles to save a kidnapped Kutlu Bike, who is kept by Genghis Khan. The minute Jalaluddin sees Kutlu Bike, he instantly loves Kutlu Bike. But, he doesn't know the secret she hides behind her beauty. Kutlu Bike also loves Jalaluddin, and one night when she wants to tell him something, but he is not there,  Shirin spies on her and thinks that she has already started sleeping with him without marrying him, and she receives a slap on her face by Aycicek for slandering her son.  Her brother, is kept captive by Genghis Khan, so in a way, Kutlu Bike is spying for him, although she detests him for he killed and burned her whole tribe, her parents and kidnapped her brother and his Mentor. 
Meanwhile, Shirin also loves Jalaluddin, until Mihricihan, UzlagShah's mother tells her to marry her son, Uzlagshah. Uzlagshah also secretly loves Shirin, and Shirin starts liking him after he agrees for the marriage. Another reason she married him was because he was going to become a Sultan and she'd be a Sultan's wife.

Shirin marries him on a journey to visit her sick mother, who later dies. There is no one else to watch their marriage, so it's a Nikah. Turkan Hatun runs away and brings a army to fight her Son, but Jalaluddin stops the war by a Shiekh. They return to the palace soon. 
Jalaluddin buys Kutlu Bike a beautiful dress before her wedding. Jalaluddin marries Kutlu Bike, with people dancing and singing and on his first night with her, when they are getting ready for bed,  he finds out all her secrets. He is angry with her and sets off to get her brother back. Meanwhile, they have captured Behram, a cloth seller, who in fact is a Batini. He ordered poisoning Shirin and Kutlu Bike. Temur Melik is Jalauddin's mentor and somebody he trusts. Jalauddin rescues Kutlu Bike's brother and brings him back to his sister, after which they are a happy family.  His father names his heir, UzlagShah, who tried to fight against his father, while it was supposed to be Jalauddin.
Jalauddin's mother, Aycicek is really upset because of this, but Jalauddin assures her everything is OK. 
The season finishes with the Khwarizms going for war with the Mongols. Uzlakshah, his brother Akshah and Jalauddin set off with their father and army to fight them. Turkan Hatun is at peace with her daughters in law, and with her grandchildren's wives, finally. Kutlu Bike's brother smells buttercup, a poisonous herb in Turkan Hatun's sherbet and asks her why she is drinking it. That herb had made her ill and pale. One of her servants had tried to poison her.

Cast 

 Emre Kıvılcım as Jalal al-Din Mangburni, husband of Kutlu Bike, and eldest son of the Sultan. 
 Javohir Zokirov as Genghis Khan
 Kaan Yalçın as Ala ad-Din Muhammad II, father of Jalaluddin, UzlagShah ,and Akshah. Silly Sultan, lose much because of his foolishness. 
 Yulduz Rajabova as Kutlu Bike, wife of Jalaluddin, first bad than becomes Good after marrying her love. 
 Feruza Normatova as  Shirin, wife of Uzlagshah.
  as Temur Malik, Jalauddin's mentor. 
 Nurmuxammadxon Xusniddinov as Jochi

Production 

The television series includes both Turkish and Uzbek actors and it is produced by Turkish screenwriter Mehmet Bozdağ, while being directed by Metin Günay. Nurgissa Almurat of Kazakhstan, Reza Himmeti of Iran are also directors of the series. A statement said, "About a thousand people will take part in the project. The series, which will be shot in Uzbekistan and Turkey, consists of 13 episodes, and each episode will be one hour long". Mendirman Jaloliddin is sometimes considered a "multi-part film" or just a "film" for its short amount of episodes and shorter amount of screentime, however, there is likely to be a second season. Uzbek and Turkish artists gathered at the  studio for the first part of the production and answered the questions from the audience live after the first episode of the series was broadcast.

After a conference in Tashkent where it was first announced that a series with this name will be produced, an intensive collaboration between producers, directors, screenwriters, historians, consultants, artists, art directors, architects and costume designers began. Tough casting awaited many Turkish and Uzbek actors for the series who had to receive special training for battle scenes, horse riding and fencing. They also had to learn each other's languages. The digital effects of Mendirman Celaleddin, which employs a team of about 500 people behind the scenes, included 200 people from Turkey, England, India and Malaysia. Based on the sketches of Turkish and Uzbek artists, more than 200 tailors worked on costumes for the series.

Set 

The Bozdağ Film set was prepared to build an atmosphere of the 13th century. In Turkey, it was built on an area of 30 hectares and above the two-storey Khorezmshah palace building, 5.5 meters high, which filled an area of 3,500 square meters, 1,200 people worked. Uzbek media has said that the set looks exactly like how a real 13th-century palace would be like. The streets of Konye-Urgench, residential buildings, the central market were also built and praised.  The desert battle scenes were filmed in Aksaray, 750 km from Istanbul. It was scheduled to premiere in January 2021 but instead was released in February.

Release 
Mehmet Bozdağ announced in 2020 that he had been working on the new project since 2018, at the request of the Government of Uzbekistan. Saida Mirziyoyeva the deputy chairperson of the board of trustees of the Public Foundation for Support and Development of National Mass Media in Uzbekistan, said on Twitter, “Dear Friends, I am pleased to announce that on February 14 at 20:30 the Milliy TV channel will start showing the historical series “Mendirman Jaloliddin”. She further said, “Great script, great acting – this series captures from the first to the last episode. And most importantly, it gives an idea of the history of our region for the general public in an understandable colorful language of cinema. I highly recommend watching it!” It was eventually released on 14 February 2021.

Reception 

The television series picked up attention in Pakistan and with the release of only the first episode, it became popular and social media users began to share links to the first episode in Urdu subtitles.

List of Episodes:

Mendirman Jaloliddin currently has two season

Episode 1:Celaleddin disobeys the order of his father the sultan and joins a group of envoys to the Mongol lands. There he 'rescues' Kutlu Bike, without knowing that it is a set up by Genghis Khan. The Mongols give chase but are fought off by the Khwarezmians.

Episode 2:Sultan Alaeddin applauds his son on his exploits, but throws him in prison for a while since he disobeyed his orders. Kutlu Bike assists in a plot to frame Turkan Hatun, who is confined to her room but escapes.

Episode 3:Turkan Hatun prepares to wage war against her son. Mihri Chihan and Uzlagshah join her.

Episode 4: Celaleddin, upon running into his grandmother's forces duels Uzlagshah, who is deeated. Necmeddin Kubra negotiates the end of the war, and Turkan Hatun's faction returns to the palace. Turkan continues plotting, while Uzlagshah has talks with the hashashins under Behram. Behram sneaks a poisonous snake into the palace to bite Kutlu Bike.

Episode 5:Shirin and Uzlagshah go to visit Sirin's mother. They run into Mongol general Subutai, who previously clashed with Celaleddin. Uzlagsh defeats his opponent, while Celaleddin and Kutlu Bike are married with Behram in attendance.

Episode 6:Behram is captured and Kutlu reveals her secrets. Celaleddin goes into the forest to capture Dohto, an opponent of Genghis Khan, so that they can exchange him for Kutlu's brother Cihangir, who is being held hostage by Genghis so that Kutlu will do his bidding.

Episode 7: Dohto is captured and all goes according to plan. After executing Dohto, Genghis sends his son Cuci, along with Cebe and Subutai, to attack Khwarezm. Uzlagshah and Sirin have by now returned, and the series ends on the eve of Sultan Alaeddin fighting the Mongols.

Episode 8:  Sultan Alaeddin win battle against Mongol at the end of episode they return to the palace.

References

External links 
 

2021 Uzbekistani television series debuts
2020s Turkish television series
Television series set in the 13th century
Uzbekistani television series
Uzbek-language television shows
War drama television series